Dragun, Draguns (Latvian variant) or Drahun (Belarusian variant; Cyrillic: Драгун) is the surname of the following people:
Aksana Drahun (born 1981), Belarusian sprinter
Anton Dragúň (born 1942), football player and manager from Slovakia 
Charmaine Dragun (1978–2007), Australian broadcast journalist and presenter
Dmitri Dragun (born 1994), Russian ice dancer
Kamil Dragun (born 1995), Polish chess grandmaster 
Nikita Dragun, Belgian-born American YouTuber, make-up artist, and model
Osvaldo Dragún (1929–1999), Argentine playwright
Stanislaw Drahun (born 1988), Belarusian football player 
Vladimirs Draguns (born 1972), Latvian football midfielder